Anycles brinkleyi is a moth of the subfamily Arctiinae. It was described by Rothschild in 1912. It was described from the Canca Valley of Colombia.

References

Moths described in 1912
Euchromiina
Moths of South America